Yawning Sons/WaterWays is a split extended play by the collaborative musical projects Yawning Sons and WaterWays. It was released on December 24, 2010 by SpaceAge & Cheesecake Records. The EP is the second release from Yawning Sons, following up on their debut studio album Ceremony to the Sunset, and received generally positive reviews from music critics.

Production
Following the release of Ceremony to the Sunset, Gary Arce of Yawning Sons went back to the studio at the request of Linda Perry to record a series of tracks with fellow Yawning Sons member Mario Lalli and Fatso Jetson's Tony Tornay at the Donner and Blitzen Studio in Los Angeles. California. The new tracks formed part of a new band called WaterWays which, together with Arce, Lalli and Tornay, featured Abby Travis on vocals for a selection of tracks.

WaterWays contributed two tracks, whose genre they describe as "aqua beat surf rock", towards the split, while Yawning Sons re-recorded and expanded one of the "Garden Sessions" outtakes from their Ceremony to the Sunset studio sessions. The tracks were mastered at Abbey Road Studios in London.

Promotion
On February 7, 2011, Nick Hannon of Yawning Sons and SpaceAge & Cheesecake Records owner Peter Peeters promoted the EP on FM Brussel's daytime metal show.

Track listing

Personnel

 Gary Arce – electric guitar
 Blake – sound manipulation
 Nick Hannon – bass guitar
 Marlon King – electric guitar
 Mario Lalli – bass guitar
 Stevie B – drums
 Tony Tornay – drums
 Abby Travis – vocals

References

2010 albums
Yawning Sons albums
Collaborative albums